Macrobela is a monotypic moth genus of the family Crambidae described by Alfred Jefferis Turner in 1939. It contains only one species, Macrobela phaeophasma, described by the same author in the same year, which is found in Australia, where it has been recorded from Queensland.

References

Spilomelinae
Crambidae genera
Taxa named by Alfred Jefferis Turner
Monotypic moth genera